The Men's Downhill LW1 was one of the events held in Alpine skiing at the 1988 Winter Paralympics in Innsbruck.

There were 6 competitors in the final.

The United States' Dan Ashbaugh set a time of 1:25.12, taking the gold medal. Since only three skiers finished, all three won a medal.

Results

Final

References 

Downhill